The Cylindrotominae are a subfamily from the family Cylindrotomidae. These flies are closely related to true crane flies.

Genera
Cylindrotoma Macquart, 1834
Diogma Edwards, 1938
Liogma Osten Sacken, 1869
Phalacrocera Schiner, 1863
Triogma Schiner, 1863

References

 

Nematocera subfamilies
Cylindrotomidae